Carnon Downs is a village in Cornwall, England, United Kingdom. It is about three miles southwest of Truro on the A39 Truro to Falmouth road.

Carnon Downs is in the civil parish of Feock (the population at the 2011 census included here) and consists mostly of bungalows and detached housing built in the latter half of the 20th century.

References

Villages in Cornwall